Life.Church (pronounced "Life Church", formerly known as LifeChurch.tv, Life Covenant Church, and Life Church) is an American evangelical multi-site church based in Edmond, Oklahoma. Craig Groeschel is the founder and senior pastor of Life.Church. Weekly church attendance was 85,000 people in 2018. The church is known for its YouVersion ministry, which publishes the Bible App.

History
In January 1996, Life.Church was founded as Life Covenant Church in Oklahoma City with 40 congregants meeting together in a two-car garage. The church membership grew rapidly, and Life.Church built its first facility (now known as the "Oklahoma City Campus") in 1999. 

In 2001, MetroChurch, a 25-year-old, nondenominational church in nearby Edmond, Oklahoma merged with Life.Church, effectively making it a multi-site church. With this merger, they changed their name, combining Life Covenant Church with MetroChurch to arrive at the name "LifeChurch".
Following the multi-site services, the church launched campuses in Tulsa and Stillwater, Oklahoma in 2003, with these new campuses incorporating satellite video teaching into their services.

Life.Church opened an additional campus in Oklahoma City, the South Oklahoma City Campus, in Spring 2005. In February 2006, Life.Church introduced a campus in Fort Worth, Texas, its first location outside Oklahoma. In April 2006, the church established its "Internet Campus" which broadcasts weekly, interactive worship services live over the internet.

On Easter Sunday, 2007, Life.Church began broadcasting from their new campus in the online game Second Life. Also in 2007, Life.Church opened campuses in northwest Oklahoma City, another in Wellington, Florida in 2012 and in Albany, New York in 2016.  

In 2012, the church had more than 26,000 members.

In 2015, the church had 15 campuses in different American states.

In 2018, the church would have 85,000 people and had opened 30 campuses in different cities.

Beliefs 
The Church has an evangelical confession of faith and is a member of  the Evangelical Covenant Church.

See also
List of the largest evangelical churches
List of the largest evangelical church auditoriums
Worship service (evangelicalism)

References

External links
Official website

Religious mass media in the United States
Religious television stations in the United States
Evangelical megachurches in the United States
Christian organizations established in 1996
Edmond, Oklahoma
Non-denominational Evangelical multisite churches